Derrius is a given name. Notable people with the name include:

Derrius Brooks (born 1988), American football player
Derrius Guice (born 1997), American football player
Derrius Quarles, American social entrepreneur, human rights activist, recording artist, and writer
Derrius Thompson (born 1977), American football player

Masculine given names